is a Japanese singer, model, and actress. She is a member of the Japanese female idol group Hinatazaka46 and an exclusive model for the women's fashion magazine Seventeen.

Career
On August 13, 2017, Kosaka passed the auditions for new members of Keyakizaka46's subgroup Hiragana Keyakizaka46 and entered the group as a second generation member. She made her debut in the song "No War in the Future", a B-side to "Kaze ni Fukarete mo". On May 19, 2018, Kosaka made her runway debut at the GirlsAward 2018 SPRING/SUMMER show. Seventeen announced two days later that she would be one of the magazine's exclusive models.

After Hiragana Keyakizaka46 was renamed to Hinatazaka46 in February 2019, Kosaka was selected to hold the center (lead performer) position in the title song of their debut single, "Kyun". She continued to hold the position until the fourth single title song, "Sonna Koto Nai yo".

Kosaka was cast as the main character in the 2019 mystery film . She would also appear in Jump!! The Heroes Behind the Gold, a 2021 film about ski jumping at the 1998 Winter Olympics, in which her character is based on ski jumper ; Hominis commented that despite performing alongside more experienced cast members, she maintained a unique presence by acting "from the heart".

Kosaka's solo photobook, produced by the Seventeen magazine editorial staff, was released on June 29. The book placed first in Oricon's 2021 photobook sales ranking with 166,876 copies sold. As a dinosaur enthusiast, she was also appointed in the same month the ambassador for Sony's DinoScience exhibition, which would be held from July to September at the Pacifico Yokohama. However, she went into hiatus on June 26 for health reasons and did not participate in the rest of the event; she also did not appear in Hinatazaka46's sixth single, "Tteka". Kosaka announced her resumption of activities on March 4, 2022 and also returned to the center position for Hinatazaka46's seventh single title track "Boku Nanka", despite her "mixed feelings" about the appointment.

Personal life 
Kosaka played volleyball in middle school and occasionally demonstrates her skill in her appearances. She has an older brother who is a Keyakizaka46 fan.

Kosaka's main interests include dinosaurs and reptiles. She also enjoys comedy shows and named Kazuya Kojima of Unjash and Audrey as her favorite comedians.

Discography 
Kosaka has participated in all Hinatazaka46 title tracks except "Tteka" (2021) and has been the center (lead performer) in all of them except "Kimi Shika Katan" (2021) and "Tsuki to Hoshi ga Odoru Midnight" (2022). Other prominent appearances include:

 "Kirei ni Naritai" (Hashiridasu Shunkan, 2018), as a trio with Akari Nibu and Miho Watanabe
 "Footsteps" ("Kyun" B-side, 2019), performed by all of the group's exclusive magazine models at the time
 "See Through" (Hinatazaka, 2020), duet with Miku Kanemura
 "Sekai ni wa Thank You! ga Afureteiru" ("Kimi Shika Katan" B-side, 2021), center, second generation member song
 "Mou Konna ni Suki ni Narenai" ("Boku Nanka" B-side, 2022), performed by all members born in 2002 (Kosaka, Miku Kanemura, and Hiyori Hamagishi)

Videography

Video albums

Filmography

Film

Television

Music video

Bibliography

References

External links
  
 Seventeen official profile 

2002 births
Living people
Actresses from Osaka Prefecture
21st-century Japanese actresses
Hinatazaka46 members
Japanese idols
Japanese female models
Japanese film actresses
Musicians from Osaka Prefecture